Arkansas Highway 151 (AR 151, Hwy. 151) is a designation for two north–south state highways in Mississippi County, Arkansas. An eastern route of  runs from Highway 148 north to Highway 18. A second route of  begins at Highway 18 in Blytheville and runs north to Missouri supplemental route TT (SSR-TT) at the Missouri state line.  A third route was dedicated in May 2013  and begins at State Line Avenue in Texarkana and continues east to Interstate 49/U.S. Route 71.

Route description

Highway 148 to Blytheville
The route begins at Highway 148 southeast of Blytheville and runs north near Promised Land to intersect the eastern end of Highway 312 at the Blytheville city limits. Highway 151 continues north into Blytheville over the BNSF railroad tracks to terminate at Highway 18.

Blytheville to Missouri
Highway 151 begins at Highway 18 (Main Street) in Blytheville and runs north to Gosnell and Arkansas International Airport.

Texarkana
This  section is an extension of Loop 151 and was formerly signed Arkansas Highway 245.  It serves to complete the three-quarter, freeway-grade beltway around Texarkana, which connects I-49 with Interstate 369.  The route was signed at the on-ramps from the Arkansas side of State Line Avenue with 151 shields and has no exits between its termini.

Major intersections
Mile markers reset at concurrencies.

|-
| align=center colspan=3 | Highway 151 begins at Highway 18
|-

See also

 List of state highways in Arkansas

References

External links

151
Transportation in Mississippi County, Arkansas